The Australian Journal of Chemistry - an International Journal for Chemical Science is a monthly peer-reviewed scientific journal published by CSIRO Publishing. It was established in 1948 and covers all aspects of chemistry. The editors-in-chief are George Koutsantonis (University of Western Australia) and John Wade (University of Melbourne).

Abstracting and indexing
The journal is abstracted and indexed in:
CAB Abstracts
Chemical Abstracts Service
Current Contents/Physical, Chemical & Earth Sciences
EBSCO databases
Ei Compendex
Science Citation Index
Scopus
According to the Journal Citation Reports, the journal has a 2020 impact factor of 1.32.

See also
Environmental Chemistry (journal)
List of scientific journals in chemistry

References

External links

Chemistry journals
CSIRO Publishing academic journals
Monthly journals
English-language journals
Publications established in 1948